Reaching for the Stars is a 1955 West German drama film directed by Carl-Heinz Schroth and starring Erik Schumann, Liselotte Pulver and Gustav Knuth.

The film's sets were designed by the art director Hans Sohnle. It was made at the Bavaria Studios in Munich. It was partly shot on location in Venice.

Cast
 Erik Schumann as Turell
 Liselotte Pulver as Christine
 Gustav Knuth as Carlo
 Oliver Grimm as Christian
 Ilse Werner as Carola
 Anna-Maria Sandri as Kiki
 Nadja Tiller as Daniela
 Margarete Haagen as The Baroness
 Paul Henckels as Turell's father
 Sybil Werden as Elena
 Carsta Löck as Mrs. Vermeeren
 Michael Ande as Peppino
 Rudolf Vogel
 Paul Bildt

References

Bibliography 
 Bock, Hans-Michael & Bergfelder, Tim. The Concise Cinegraph: Encyclopaedia of German Cinema. Berghahn Books, 2009.

External links 
 

1955 films
1955 drama films
German drama films
West German films
1950s German-language films
Films directed by Carl-Heinz Schroth
Films shot in Venice
Films shot at Bavaria Studios
German black-and-white films
1950s German films